Hunterstown may refer to:

Places
United Kingdom
Hunterstown, County Tyrone, a townland in County Tyrone, Northern Ireland
United States
Hunterstown, Pennsylvania, an unincorporated community in Pennsylvania, United States
Hunterstown Historic District

See also
Hunterstown GAA, a Gaelic Athletic Association club in County Louth, Ireland
Hunterstown Rovers GAC, a Gaelic Athletic Association club in County Louth, Ireland
Battle of Hunterstown